Karate at the Summer Olympics made its debut at the 2020 Games in Tokyo, Japan.

Olympic karate featured two types of events: Kumite and Kata. Sixty competitors from around the world competed in the Kumite competition, and twenty competed in the Kata competition. Both divisions of the competition were split 50/50 between men and women.

It is governed by the World Karate Federation (WKF).

Background
The effort to bring karate to the Olympics was begun in the 1970s by Jacques Delcourt.
 In 2009, in the 121st International Olympic Committee voting, karate did not receive the necessary two-thirds majority vote to become an Olympic sport. Karate was being considered for the 2020 Olympics, however at a meeting of the IOC's executive board, held in Russia on 29 May 2013, it was decided that karate (along with wushu and several non-martial arts) would not be considered for inclusion in 2020 at the IOC's 125th session in Buenos Aires, Argentina, in September 2013.

Bid for inclusion
In September 2015, karate was included in a shortlist along with baseball, softball, skateboarding, surfing, and sport climbing to be considered for inclusion in the 2020 Summer Olympics; and in June 2016, the Executive Board of the International Olympic Committee (IOC) announced that they would support the proposal to include all of the shortlisted sports in the 2020 Games. Finally, on 3 August 2016, all five sports (counting baseball and softball together as one sport) were approved for inclusion in the 2020 Olympic program. Karate will not be included in the 2024 Olympic Games and there is no word yet if it will be included in a future Olympic Games.

Format and rules

The Olympic karate competition will put eight gold medals in dispute: six for the Kumite (fight) competition (with three weight categories for each sex) and two for the Kata (form) competition (one for each sex). 

The main rules for Kumite and Kata competitions are as follows:

Kumite

The individual tournament for the Kumite competition at the World Karate Federation (WKF) Karate World Championships is held under a weight class system comprising five divisions each for both men and women. However, the Kumite competition at the Summer Olympics will consist of just three divisions each, thus:
 
Weight classes for men: −67 kg, −75 kg, +75 kg
Weight classes for women: −55 kg, −61 kg, +61 kg

Kumite rules

All Kumite bouts are semi-contact, meaning all strikes delivered cannot use full force. Striking an opponent with full force can result in a warning or disqualification. In any category, fights last for up to three timed minutes (i.e. the clock stops every time the referee says yame). During that period, the winner is considered to be the karateka who scores eight points more than their adversary. If this does not happen, the person with more points at the end of the fight is the winner. If the fight ends up tied, a decision will be given through the senshu rule: the contestant that scored the first unopposed point wins.

Assignment of points

Points are earned as follows:
Ippon (three points): for hitting the head or neck of the opponent with a kick, or when any technique is applied to a fallen adversary.
Waza-ari (two points): for applying a kick to the belly, side, back or torso of the opponent.
Yuko (one point): for delivering a punch with closed hand (tsuki) or strike (uchi) to the head, neck, belly, side, back or torso of the opponent.

Strikes below the belt are strictly forbidden and strength must always be controlled as the fighter will receive a warning if they hurt their opponent, points may be lost or there may even be a disqualification if the resulting injury is severe. Knocking an opponent down to the floor without at least attempting to strike them is also liable to be punished.

Warning levels:
Chukoku (first warning): for committing a minor infraction for the first time.
Keikoku (second warning): for the same minor infraction, or for committing a medium infraction for the first time.
Hansoku-chui (third warning): for committing the same minor infraction for the third time, the same medium infraction for a second time, or for committing a major infraction for the first time (usually excessive contact to vital parts or below the belt, really hurting the opponent).
Hansoku (fourth and final warning): inflicting serious damage on the team score as a whole. The victory is given to the opponent.

Warnings and punishments are divided into two different categories, the first being for excessive and/or illegal contact and the other for technical violations, such as leaving the koto (fighting space) or faking an injury in order to make the referee give the opponent a warning.

Kata

Competitors are judged on the power and correctness of their techniques. Under conventional competition rules, one competitor is assigned a blue belt and the other a red belt, and each takes a turn in demonstrating their kata. The outcome of the competition is determined under a flag system, where five judges who each have a blue flag and a red flag raise either to signal which competitor, they believe, won: the one with more flags raised in their favour is declared the winner. However discussions are still ongoing into the judging system, including whether to use a scoring system rather than the flag system.

Due to the immense number of karate styles, each with its own katas, only katas from the styles recognized by the WKF (Gōjū-ryū, Shitō-ryū, Shotokan and Wadō-ryū) are allowed in the Olympics. The lack of representation of other karate styles in the kata competition has generated criticism from practitioners of these styles.

Medalists

Medal table
Sources:

Men

Women

References

External links
 Complete Results book of Karate Event in Tokyo 2020 Olympic Games 

 
Sports at the Summer Olympics
Olympics